is a Japanese fantasy film released in 2014. It was directed by Takashi Shimizu and based on the children's fantasy novel of the same name.

Plot 
The young witch, Kiki still lives with her parents, her witch mother, Kokiri and her ordinary human father, Okino. But with her 13th birthday everything has to change. An old witchcraft law dictates that at this age she must leave her loving home in order to live as a witch in a strange place for a whole year. She sets off on her broomstick. Her black cat Jiji is allowed to accompany her. After hours of flight, over land and sea, she discovers a strange city by the sea. Rather involuntarily, she makes a stopover at the local zoo, where she has to realize that not every resident likes witches. But soon after, Kiki meets the baker Osono, who offers Kiki a place to live under the roof of her windmill.

Next, Kiki has to find a living. Kiki can only fly with her magic powers, which she loves to do. Encouraged by Osono, she decides to open an air delivery service in the sleepy coastal town. At first she didn't want to hire anyone. Only a few aviation-obsessed youngsters are interested in them. But Osono continues to support Kiki and slowly the flight business begins to take off. With her cheerful nature and courage, she is slowly making friends. But then she is taken advantage of by a teenager who was interested in her magic powers. She tells other youths that Kiki can curse her. In order to scare them, she sends Kiki to them with an alleged curse letter. When Kiki realizes the truth, she is very disappointed and sad. 

The next setback follows shortly thereafter. It is reported on TV that a hippo from the zoo where Kiki ended up when she arrived in town has become ill. Rumor has it that Kiki can bewitch and curse people and animals. Your delivery service comes to a standstill. The suspicion and fear of the residents weigh so heavily on Kiki that she falls ill. She loses her courage and with it her magic powers. The flying boy named Tombo encourages Kiki to stay true to himself. Kiki begins to overcome her self-doubt. She accepts a risky job from the zoo director. The sick hippo baby Maruko is to be treated by a famous veterinarian who lives far away from the small town on a small island. Despite a heavy storm, Kiki takes off immediately. She transports the injured baby hippo on a stretcher. Tombo, who also accompanies her during the flight, encourages her constantly. Below them the turbulent sea threatens.

Meanwhile, the people of the city are listening to the radio, listening to news of the rescue operation. Finally, Kiki and her friends reach the island, and the doctor quickly heals the hippopotamus Maruko in a few simple steps. The population, who understood after the rescue operation that Kiki is a lovely witch, celebrates her and her rescue operation at the end of the story. And soon after that, Kiki's apprenticeship year away from home is over, so she can call herself a real witch.

Cast
Fuka Koshiba as Kiki
Ryōhei Hirota as Tombo
Machiko Ono as Osono, the baker
Hiroshi Yamamoto as Fukuo, her husband
Miho Kanazawa as Saki
Rie Miyazawa as Kokiri
Michitaka Tsutsui as Okino
Minako Kotobuki as voice of Jiji the cat
Tadanobu Asano as Dr. Ishi
LiLiCo as voice of radio DJ

Release
Kiki's Delivery Service was released in Japan on March 1, 2014. It was the third highest-grossing film on its release in Japan, making ¥128 million (US$1.25 million) from 117,000 admissions on 281 screens.

Reception
Film Business Asia gave the film a four out of ten rating, referring to the film as "bland, charmless and undramatic". The review stated that actress Fuka Koshiba was "way too mature for the 13-year-old, waifish Kiki and has a forced perkiness that drags the action down" and stated that "the visual and special effects are more run-of-the-mill 20th century than state-of-the-art 21st". Variety gave the film a negative review, finding "its charmless heroine, leaden storytelling and dime-store production values unlikely to bewitch anyone except tiny tots."

References

External links
 
 

2014 films
Japanese fantasy films
2014 fantasy films
2010s children's films
Japanese children's fantasy films
Films based on Japanese novels
Films directed by Takashi Shimizu
Films shot in Tokyo
Films with screenplays by Satoko Okudera
Films scored by Taro Iwashiro
Films about witchcraft
2010s Japanese films
2010s Japanese-language films